Zeadmete finlayi is a species of sea snail, a marine gastropod mollusk in the family Cancellariidae, the nutmeg snails.

Description

Distribution

References

 Petit, R.E. & Harasewych, M.G. (2005) Catalogue of the superfamily Cancellarioidea Forbes and Hanley, 1851 (Gastropoda: Prosobranchia)- 2nd edition. Zootaxa, 1102, 3–161. NIZT 682
 Hemmen J. (2007). Recent Cancellariidae. Wiesbaden, 428pp

Cancellariidae
Gastropods described in 1940